Caroebe is a municipality located in the southeast of the state of Roraima in Brazil. Its population is 10,383 (as of 2020) and its area is 12,066 km². It is the easternmost municipality in Roraima and the only one to border the state of Pará. Careoebe became an independent municipality in 1994.

Climate
Caroebe has a tropical rainforest climate (Af) with moderate rainfall from September to March and heavy rainfall from April to August.

References

External links 
 Official website (in Portuguese)
 

Municipalities in Roraima
Populated places established in 1994
1994 establishments in Brazil